The blackfin sucker (Thoburnia atripinnis) is a species of ray-finned fish in the family Catostomidae. It is found only in the United States in the headwaters of the Barren River system in south central Kentucky.

References

Thoburnia
Fish described in 1959
Taxonomy articles created by Polbot
Barren River